The 2004 LEN European Championships were held in Madrid, Spain from 5–16 May, at the M86 Swimming Center in the southeast of the city. The championships brought together the European Championships in swimming (long course), open water swimming, diving and synchronised swimming. Since the event was held less than three months before the Summer Olympics in Athens, Greece, some of the participating nations used the event therefore as a qualifying tournament for the Olympics.

Medal table

Swimming

Men's events

Women's events

Open water swimming

Men's events

Women's events

Diving

Men's events

Women's events

Synchronized swimming

External links
Official results
Diving Results
 Swim Rankings Results

LEN European Aquatics Championships
E
S
European Aquatics
European 2004
May 2004 sports events in Europe
2004 in Madrid